The 2007–08 Skeleton World Cup is a multi race tournament over a season for skeleton. The season started on 26 November 2007 and ended on 24 February 2008. The World Cup is organised by the FIBT who also run world cups and championships in bobsleigh.

Calendar

Standings

Men's

Women's

Skeleton World Cup, 2007-08
Skeleton World Cup, 2007-08
Skeleton World Cup